Kwak Dong-hyuk (Hangul: 곽동혁; born , in Seoul) is a South Korean male volleyball player. On club level he currently  plays for the Uijeongbu KB Insurance Stars.

Career

Clubs
In the 2005 V-League Draft, Kwak was selected eighth overall by the  Gumi LIG Greaters.

National team
As a sophomore at Hanyang University in 2003, Kwak was selected for the South Korean junior national team and participated in the 2003 World Junior (U21) Volleyball Championship, where he led his team to the semifinals of the tournament as the starting libero.

In May 2017 Kwak first got called up to the South Korean senior national team for the 2017 FIVB World League. Kwak, however, was eventually placed on injured reserve due to a finger injury suffered in training camp.

In May 2018 Kwak was selected for Team Korea again to compete at the inaugural FIVB Nations League, where he played as the starting libero for the team.

External links
 Profile at FIVB.org

1983 births
Living people
South Korean men's volleyball players
21st-century South Korean people